Jonas Marz (born 13 May 1989) is a German footballer who plays for KSV Hessen Kassel.

External links

1989 births
Living people
German footballers
TSV 1860 Munich II players
1. FC Kaiserslautern II players
VfR Aalen players
KSV Hessen Kassel players
3. Liga players
Association football midfielders
People from Speyer
Footballers from Rhineland-Palatinate